Arturo Kinch (born 15 April 1956) is a customer service representative for United Airlines who has been one of only three skiers from Costa Rica in Winter Olympic Games history, most recently as a 49-year-old cross-country skier in the 2006 XX Olympic Winter Games.

Childhood
Born the seventh child in a family that would grow to a total of thirteen and the son of missionary parents in Costa Rica, Kinch enrolled at Rockmont College (now Colorado Christian University) in 1974 on a soccer scholarship.

Downhill skiing
At university Kinch also played basketball to keep in shape but became a seldom-used reserve, so he turned to downhill skiing for more playing time. He would score the most points on the ski team in spite of his inexperience, spurring coaches to encourage him to continue with the sport.

After his graduation from the College in 1979 with degrees in biblical studies and camping and recreation, Kinch kept racing.

Winter Olympics
In 1978 he founded the Costa Rica Ski Association to qualify for the 1980 XIII Olympic Winter Games after learning that eligibility for international competition required belonging to a national ski association. In Lake Placid Kinch competed as Costa Rica's first and only Olympic skier before competing in the 1984 XIV Olympic Winter Games, 1988 XV Olympic Winter Games, 2002 XIX Olympic Winter Games, and XX Games. In 2004 Kinch was inducted into Colorado Christian University's Hall of Fame.

Family
Kinch has one daughter and lives in Denver.

See also
 Philip Boit
 Prawat Nagvajara
 Isaac Menyoli

External links 
 Miami Herald Interview
 Hall of Fame biography

1956 births
Living people
Skiers from Denver
Costa Rican male cross-country skiers
Costa Rican male alpine skiers
Alpine skiers at the 1980 Winter Olympics
Alpine skiers at the 1984 Winter Olympics
Cross-country skiers at the 1984 Winter Olympics
Alpine skiers at the 1988 Winter Olympics
Cross-country skiers at the 1988 Winter Olympics
Cross-country skiers at the 2002 Winter Olympics
Cross-country skiers at the 2006 Winter Olympics
Olympic cross-country skiers of Costa Rica
Olympic alpine skiers of Costa Rica
Costa Rican people of American descent